Redinha beach (Praia da Redinha) is a beach located on the Brazilian capital city Natal, Rio Grande do Norte.

External links

Beaches of Brazil
Landforms of Rio Grande do Norte